Randy Holloway (born August 26, 1955, in Sharon, Pennsylvania) is a former National Football League defensive end who played from 1978 to 1984 for the Minnesota Vikings and the St. Louis Cardinals. He attended the University of Pittsburgh and was the Vikings first round draft pick in the 1978 NFL Draft.

On September 16, 1984 Holloway recorded five sacks versus the Atlanta Falcons, which still stands (through the 2018 season) as the Vikings team record.

1955 births
Living people
People from Sharon, Pennsylvania
Players of American football from Pennsylvania
All-American college football players
American football defensive ends
Pittsburgh Panthers football players
Minnesota Vikings players
St. Louis Cardinals (football) players